The 2011–12 season will be Szombathelyi Haladás's 56th competitive season, 4th consecutive season in the OTP Bank Liga and 92nd year in existence as a football club.

First team squad

Transfers

Summer

In:

Out:

Winter

In:

Out:

List of Hungarian football transfer summer 2011
List of Hungarian football transfers winter 2011–12

Statistics

Appearances and goals
Last updated on 27 May 2012.

|-
|colspan="14"|Youth players

|-
|colspan="14"|Players currently out on loan

|-
|colspan="14"|Players no longer at the club:

|}

Top scorers
Includes all competitive matches. The list is sorted by shirt number when total goals are equal.

Last updated on 27 May 2012

Disciplinary record
Includes all competitive matches. Players with 1 card or more included only.

Last updated on 27 May 2012

Overall
{|class="wikitable"
|-
|Games played || 40 (30 OTP Bank Liga, 4 Hungarian Cup and 6 Hungarian League Cup)
|-
|Games won || 13 (9 OTP Bank Liga, 2 Hungarian Cup and 2 Hungarian League Cup)
|-
|Games drawn || 13 (11 OTP Bank Liga, 1 Hungarian Cup and 1 Hungarian League Cup)
|-
|Games lost || 14 (10 OTP Bank Liga, 1 Hungarian Cup and 3 Hungarian League Cup)
|-
|Goals scored || 50
|-
|Goals conceded || 47
|-
|Goal difference || +3
|-
|Yellow cards || 101
|-
|Red cards || 10
|-
|rowspan="2"|Worst discipline ||  Péter Halmosi (10 , 1 )
|-
|  Richárd Guzmics (8 , 2 )
|-
|rowspan="1"|Best result || 5–0 (H) v Paksi SE - OTP Bank Liga - 05-05-2012
|-
|rowspan="2"|Worst result || 1–4 (A) v Újpest FC - OTP Bank Liga - 24-09-2011
|-
| 0–3 (A) v Zalaegerszegi TE - League Cup - 16-11-2011
|-
|rowspan="3"|Most appearances ||  Péter Tóth (31 appearances)
|-
|  Richárd Guzmics (31 appearances)
|-
|  Szabolcs Schimmer (31 appearances)
|-
|rowspan="1"|Top scorer ||  Krisztián Kenesei (10 goal)
|-
|Points || 52/120 (43.33%)
|-

Nemzeti Bajnokság I

Matches

Classification

Results summary

Results by round

Hungarian Cup

Round of 16

League Cup

Matches

Classification

Pre Season (Winter)

References

External links
 Eufo
 Official Website
 UEFA
 fixtures and results

Szombathelyi Haladás seasons
Hungarian football clubs 2011–12 season